Pronatura México is the largest Mexican environmental conservation group. Founded in 1981, the organization covers 32 Mexican states, being now composed of 6 regional representations, which are:

 Pronatura, A.C.
 Pronatura Chiapas
 Pronatura Noreste
 Pronatura Noroeste
 Pronatura Península de Yucatán
 Pronatura Veracruz

These non government, nonprofit organizations share the mission of the conservation of the flora, fauna and priority ecosystems of Mexico, promoting society's development in harmony with nature. The logo, which represents a horned guan, was 'modernized' in 2006, due to the celebration of the 25th anniversary of Pronatura, keeping the horned guan, but giving it a more stylized image.

In addition to the geographic division of its conservation work, Pronatura bases its programs on Strategic Lines of Action, which are:

 Conservation and sustainable management of priority ecosystems
 Environmental education and strategic communication
 Community sustainable development
 Environmental policy and management
 Production and management of information
 Institutional development

Pronatura has a number of donors and partners, both in Mexico and internationally. This has helped Pronatura grow to be conformed by more than 500 individuals, amongst board members (both national and regional) and staff, and achieve a yearly conservation investment of over 10 million dollars.

There are four national programs, shared by all six Pronaturas with a national coordination. These are:

 Private Lands Conservation Program
 Pronatura's Centers for Conservation Information
 National Wetlands Program
 National Bird Program

See also

 Conservation biology
 Conservation ethic
 Conservation movement
 Ecology
 Ecology movement
 Environmentalism
 Environmental movement
 Environmental protection
 Habitat conservation
 List of environmental organizations
 Natural environment
 Natural capital
 Natural resource
 Renewable resource
 Sustainable development
 Sustainability

External links
Pronatura, A.C. - Main Pronatura A.C.'s website
Pronatura Noreste, A.C. - Pronatura Noreste's website
Pronatura Noroeste, A.C. - Pronatura Noroeste's website
Pronatura Península de Yucatán - Pronatura Península de Yucatán's website
Pronatura Veracruz - Pronatura Veracruz's website
Pronatura Casa Tortuga - Sea Turtle Conservation

1981 establishments in Mexico
Environmental organizations based in Mexico
Organizations established in 1981